K35OU-D, virtual channel 21 (UHF digital channel 35), is a low-powered HSN-affiliated television station licensed to Tucson, Arizona, United States. The station is owned by Ventana Television.

History
An original construction permit to build a low power television station was granted on August 23, 1989. The station, to be constructed on channel 21, was given the callsign K21CX. After a major modification and an expired construction permit, the station was licensed on October 29, 1991. The station has been sold several times since licensing and has had other affiliations, the most recent being America's Store, but was acquired by Ventana Television in June 2001 and became an HSN affiliate in 2006. On August 8, 2011, the station changed its call sign to K21CX-D upon receive its license for digital broadcasting. The station changed its call sign to K35OU-D on February 1, 2019, now being licensed to broadcast on channel 35.

External links
 HSN official site
 

35OU-D
Television channels and stations established in 1989
1989 establishments in Arizona
Low-power television stations in the United States